Huechys sanguinea, commonly known as the black and scarlet cicada, is a species of cicada belonging to the family Cicadidae.

Subspecies
Four subspecies are recognized:
 H. s. hainanensis
 H. s. philaemata
 H. s. suffusa
 H. s. wuchangensis

Description
It is a small strikingly coloured cicada. The basic body color is deep scarlet with smoky-grey wings, but proboscis and limbs are deep black. These cicadas usually emerge synchronously in April. The specific name is from Latin sanguis, blood.

Distribution
This species is native to South- and Southeast Asia, specifically India and Myanmar, southern China (including Hainan Island), Taiwan, Vietnam, Thailand, the Malay Peninsula, Borneo, Singapore and down into Sumatra and Timor.

References

Hemiptera of Asia
Taxa named by Charles De Geer
Insects described in 1773
Cicadettini